These Times is the second studio album by American rock band SafetySuit, released on January 10, 2012, through Universal Republic Records. The album follows their 2008 debut Life Left to Go. It was released exclusively through iTunes on January 3, 2012, before a wide release the following week. These Times was produced by Howard Benson, Ryan Tedder, and Espionage, along with several self-produced songs, departing from their previous work with producer Greg Archilla. The album reached number 7 on the Billboard 200 chart, making it their highest charting album to date.

Track listing

Critical reception

These Times received mostly positive reviews from music critics. Rick Florino of ARTISTdirect describes the album as "a catchy, captivating, and classy outing from modern rock's finest young outfit" that "is the first must-have album of 2012". Gregory Heaney of AllMusic rated the album three out of five stars and states: "The album finds the band taking a more spacious approach to the genre, surrounding their heartfelt, midtempo jams in a warm blanket of reverb and keyboards, giving them a real sense of depth."

Charts

Personnel
Credits adapted from AllMusic

SafetySuit
Doug Brown – vocals, guitar, keyboards, percussion
Dave Garofalo – guitar
Jeremy Henshaw – bass
Tate Cunningham – drums, keyboards, percussion

Additional musicians
 Howard Benson – keyboards
 Espen Lind – Dobro, acoustic guitar, keyboards
 Ryan Tedder – bass, drums, guitar, keyboards, background vocals
 Noel Zancanella – bass, drums, guitar, keyboards

Technical
 Jon Marius Aareskjold – mixing
 Jerry Beltran – A&R
 Howard Benson – production, programming
 Amund Björklund – engineer
 Doug Brown – engineer, production, programming
 Bruce Carbone – A&R, executive producer
 Smith Carlson – engineer
 Tate Cunningham – engineer, mixing, production, programming
 Paul DeCarli – digital editing, engineer
 Espionage – production
 Chris Gehringer – mastering
 Serban Ghenea – mixing
 John Hanes – mixing

 Hatsukazu "Hatch" Inagaki – engineer
 Rich Isaacson – executive producer
 Espen Lind – engineer, mixing
 Chris Lord-Alge – mixing
 Andres Martinez – design, photography
 Francis Murray – engineer
 Jon Nicholson – drum technician
 Mike Plotnikoff – engineer
 SafetySuit – production
 Phil Seaford – assistant
 Ryan Tedder – engineer, production, programming
 Marc VanGool – guitar technician
 Noel Zancanella – production, programming

Release history
Source: Amazon.com

References

2012 albums
SafetySuit albums
Universal Records albums
Albums produced by Ryan Tedder